Gáspár is a Hungarian masculine given name, equivalent to English Jasper, and may refer to:
Gáspár Bekes (1520–1579), Hungarian nobleman
Gáspár Boldizsár (fl. 1990s), Hungarian sprint canoer
Gáspár Borbás (1884–1976), Hungarian footballer
Gáspár Csere (born 1991), Hungarian long distance and marathon runner  
Gáspár Heltai (c. 1490–1574), Transylvanian Saxon writer and printer
Gáspár Károli (c. 1529–1591), Hungarian Calvinist pastor
Gáspár Nagy (1949-2007), Hungarian poet and writer
Gáspár Orbán (born 1992), Hungarian religious leader and footballer
Gáspár Miklós Tamás (born 1948), Hungarian philosopher and intellectual

References

Hungarian masculine given names